Congress Street in Boston, Massachusetts, is located in the Financial District and South Boston. It was first named in 1800. It was extended in 1854 (from State Street) as far as Atlantic Avenue, and in 1874 across Fort Point Channel into South Boston. Today's Congress Street consists of several segments of streets, previously named Atkinson's Street, Dalton Street, Gray's Alley, Leverett's Lane,  Quaker Lane, and Shrimpton's Lane.

See also

 Boston Children's Museum
 Boston City Hall
 The Boston Post
 Boston Reds (1890–1891)
 Children's Wharf
 Congress Street Fire Station
 Congress Street Grounds
 Dock Square (Boston, Massachusetts)
 Exchange Coffee House, Boston
 Government Center, Boston
 John Hancock Building
 Julien Hall (19th century)
 Mobius Artists Group
 New England Holocaust Memorial
 Post Office Square, Boston, Massachusetts
 Russia Wharf Buildings
 Weekly Messenger newspaper
 World Trade Center (MBTA station)

Images

References

External links

 Bostonian Society has materials related to the street.
 
 

Streets in Boston
History of Boston
Financial District, Boston
Seaport District
Government Center, Boston